Nunna Bhanumurthy (born 13 November 1954), known as Bhanu Nunna, is an Indian former professional tennis player.

A right-handed player, Nunna featured on the professional tour in the late 1970s, after playing college tennis in the United States for Clemson University. He reached a career high singles ranking of 199 in the world.

Competing on the Grand Prix circuit, his best performance was a runner-up finish in the doubles at the 1976 Indian Open, partnering Chiradip Mukerjea. He made the singles second round of the 1979 Sarasota indoor tournament, where he fell to Ilie Nastase.

Nunna appeared in the men's doubles main draws at the 1977 Wimbledon Championships and 1979 French Open.

Grand Prix career finals

Doubles: 1 (0–1)

References

External links
 
 

1954 births
Living people
Indian male tennis players
Clemson Tigers men's tennis players